The 1967–68 season was the 44th season in the existence of AEK Athens F.C. and the ninth consecutive season in the top flight of Greek football. They competed in the Alpha Ethniki, the Greek Cup and the Balkans Cup. The season began on 7 October 1967 and finished on 31 August 1968.

Overview

In the summer of 1967, the good course of the club was guaranteed by the presence, from the beginning of the season, of Jenő Csaknády. Evaluating the team's existing roster, he decided that without the need of particular transfer additions, he could turn it into a worthy contender for the title. The experience of the previous season, in which Csaknády took the team 6 points behind Olympiacos and managed to make them equal contenders, the confidence and admiration of the players towards his person and his undoubted ability and hard work, convinced everyone in AEK that better days were ahead for the club, even talking about the repeat of the championship conquest of 1963. Csaknády managed to turn the players into soldiers, ready to give their best to the team and their coach.

AEK entered the championship race and in their first six matches achieved 5 wins and a draw in the derby against Panathinaikos at Leoforos Alexandras Stadium. The team appeared complete in all their lines and under the guidance of Csaknády, seemed capable of subduing any opponent. The defeat in Katerini against Pierikos by 1–0 on 29 November, temporarily removed them from the top of the standings. The yellow-blacks reacted in a deafening and thunderous way at the very next matchday, when they destroyed the other contender, Olympiacos and their hopes in winning the league, by crushing them by 1–4. On 31 March, with their second victory over the club of Piraeus at Nea Filadelfeia, they ultimately secured the title.

While AEK had already been crowned champions, it seemed that they would achieve the conquest of the domestic double, as they eliminated Vyzas Megara, Aris and Panionios for the Greek Cup and were drawn against Olympiacos in the semi-final at Karaiskakis Stadium. However, the red and whites took their revenge for their loss of the league, by eliminating AEK by 2–1 and eventually winning the title. The Hungarian-German coach, consistent to the "tradition" he had created, did not agree on staying in the club for the next season, thus achieving the absolute of two Championship wins in his two full seasons on the bench of AEK.

Players

Squad information

NOTE: The players are the ones that have been announced by the AEK Athens' press release. No edits should be made unless a player arrival or exit is announced. Updated 31 August 1968, 23:59 UTC+2.

Transfers

In

Out

Renewals

Overall transfer activity

Expenditure:  ₯0

Income:  ₯0

Net Total:  ₯0

Pre-season and friendlies

Alpha Ethniki

League table

Results summary

Results by Matchday

Fixtures

Greek Cup

Matches

Balkans Cup

Matches

Statistics

Squad statistics

! colspan="11" style="background:#FFDE00; text-align:center" | Goalkeepers
|-

! colspan="11" style="background:#FFDE00; color:black; text-align:center;"| Defenders
|-

! colspan="11" style="background:#FFDE00; color:black; text-align:center;"| Midfielders
|-

! colspan="11" style="background:#FFDE00; color:black; text-align:center;"| Forwards
|-

|}

Disciplinary record

|-
! colspan="17" style="background:#FFDE00; text-align:center" | Goalkeepers

|-
! colspan="17" style="background:#FFDE00; color:black; text-align:center;"| Defenders

|-
! colspan="17" style="background:#FFDE00; color:black; text-align:center;"| Midfielders

|-
! colspan="17" style="background:#FFDE00; color:black; text-align:center;"| Forwards

|}

References

External links
AEK Athens F.C. Official Website

AEK Athens F.C. seasons
AEK Athens
1967-68